Dichomeris monococca is a moth in the family Gelechiidae. It was described by Edward Meyrick in 1921. It is found in Mozambique.

The wingspan is about 14 mm. The forewings are rather dark purplish grey with some scattered blackish scales between the veins and a cloudy blackish dot in the disc at one-fourth. There is a small oval whitish spot in the disc before the middle, edged anteriorly with blackish and followed by a blackish elongate blotch. The plical stigma is cloudy, blackish and nearly beneath the whitish spot. There is a cloudy whitish dot on the costa at three-fourths. The hindwings are grey.

References

Endemic fauna of Mozambique
Moths described in 1921
monococca